The Frank Sinatra Timex Show: Here's to the Ladies was a 1960 television special starring Frank Sinatra, Lena Horne, Mary Costa, Barbara Heller, Eleanor Roosevelt, and Juliet Prowse. The show was written by John Bradford and directed by Richard Dunlap. The Orchestra who helped make this show was Nelson Riddle and his Orchestra.

It was Sinatra's third special for ABC and Timex and was broadcast on February 15, 1960.

Song listing 
 "Here's to the Ladies" - Frank Sinatra
 "I've Got You Under My Skin" - Frank Sinatra
 Timex Promotional Spot
 "Ouvre ton coeur" (from Bizet's Vasco de Gama) - Mary Costa
 "By Strauss" - Barbara Heller
 "Ring the Bell" - Lena Horne
 "Come Cha Cha Cha With Me" - Juliet Prowse
 Timex Promotional Spot
 "Lonely Town" - Frank Sinatra
 "But Beautiful" - Lena Horne
 "From This Moment On" - Lena Horne
 Harold Arlen Tribute Medley: "As Long as I Live" / "It's Only a Paper Moon" / "One for My Baby (And One For The Road)" / "Ac-Cent-Tchu-Ate the Positive" / "Stormy Weather" / "Get Happy" / "Between the Devil and the Deep Blue Sea" - Frank Sinatra and Lena Horne
 "My Heart Stood Still" - Frank Sinatra
 "Yours is my Heart Alone" - Mary Costa
 "Afraid of Love" - Barbara Heller
 "My Heart Belongs to Daddy" - Lena Horne
 "My Funny Valentine" - Juliet Prowse
 Timex Promotional Segment
 "High Hopes" - Eleanor Roosevelt
 "To The Ladies" - Frank Sinatra

References

Frank Sinatra television specials